Le Déjeuner sur l'herbe (English: The Luncheon on the Grass) is a 1863 painting by Édouard Manet.

Le Déjeuner sur l'herbe or Luncheon on the Grass may also refer to:

 Déjeuner sur l'herbe (album), album by Les Breastfeeders
 Le Déjeuner sur l'herbe (Monet, Moscow), 1867 painting by Claude Monet
 Le Déjeuner sur l'herbe (Monet, Paris), 1866 painting by Claude Monet
 Le déjeuner sur l'herbe: les trois femmes noires, 2010 painting by Mickalene Thomas
 The Luncheon on the Grass (film), 1979 musical film

See also 

Picnic on the Grass, 1959 comedy film